Chatsworth is a city in Sioux County, Iowa, United States. The population was 75 at the 2020 census.

Geography
Chatsworth is located at  (42.915926, -96.516083).

Demographics

2010 census
As of the census of 2010, there were 79 people, 31 households, and 21 families living in the city. The racial makeup of the city was 98.7% White and 1.3% from other races. Hispanic or Latino of any race were 1.3% of the population.

There were 31 households, of which 32.3% had children under the age of 18 living with them, 48.4% were married couples living together, 9.7% had a female householder with no husband present, 9.7% had a male householder with no wife present, and 32.3% were non-families. 29.0% of all households were made up of individuals, and 9.7% had someone living alone who was 65 years of age or older. The average household size was 2.55 and the average family size was 3.19.

The median age in the city was 41.8 years. 25.3% of residents were under the age of 18; 8.8% were between the ages of 18 and 24; 19% were from 25 to 44; 35.5% were from 45 to 64; and 11.4% were 65 years of age or older. The gender makeup of the city was 55.7% male and 44.3% female.

2000 census
As of the census of 2000, there were 89 people, 36 households, and 23 families living in the city. The racial makeup of the city was 97.75% White, 1.12% African American and 1.12% Native American.

There were 36 households, out of which 33.3% had children under the age of 18 living with them, 47.2% were married couples living together, 2.8% had a female householder with no husband present, and 36.1% were non-families. 30.6% of all households were made up of individuals, and 13.9% had someone living alone who was 65 years of age or older. The average household size was 2.47 and the average family size was 3.09.

In the city, the population was spread out, with 31.5% under the age of 18, 4.5% from 18 to 24, 32.6% from 25 to 44, 16.9% from 45 to 64, and 14.6% who were 65 years of age or older. The median age was 35 years. For every 100 females, there were 117.1 males. For every 100 females age 18 and over, there were 103.3 males.

The median income for a household in the city was $18,333, and the median income for a family was $25,625. Males had a median income of $35,833 versus $16,875 for females. The per capita income for the city was $12,673. There were 19.0% of families and 38.1% of the population living below the poverty line, including 59.3% of under eighteens and 25.0% of those over 64.

Education
Ireton, Hawarden, Chatsworth, and surrounding rural areas formed the West Sioux Community School District in the fall of 1959.

References

Cities in Iowa
Cities in Sioux County, Iowa
Populated places established in 1900
1900 establishments in Iowa